Kashmir Daily is a Hindi-language social drama film produced and directed by Kashmiri filmmaker Hussein Khan under the banner of his own production house Seven Two Creations in Association with Safdar Arts. The film was first screened at SKICC Srinagar in March 2017. The film was released on 5 January 2018 and was shown in several cities of India in PVR Cinemas. It is the 1st Film from Kashmir which will be released throughout India.

Synopsis
The 145-minute-long film stars Mir Sarwar, Neelam Singh, Sanam Ziya, Rajinder Tickoo, Hussein Khan and Zameer Ashai. It focuses on drug abuse and the peak of unemployment in Jammu and Kashmir.

Cast

 Mir Sarwar as Hussein Durrani
 Neelam Singh as Pooja
 Sanam Ziya as Zoya
 Rajinder Tickoo as Gul Khan
 Hussein Khan  As Hyder Durrani

References

External links 
 Kashmir Daily on IMDB

2010s Hindi-language films
2017 films
Films set in Jammu and Kashmir
Films shot in Jammu and Kashmir